Dijana Vukomanović (born 3 January 1967) is a Serbian political scientist and politician. She served in the National Assembly of Serbia from 2012 to 2020, initially as a member of the Socialist Party of Serbia (SPS) and subsequently with the People's Party (Narodna stranka, NS). She also serves on the City Assembly of Belgrade. She is now a member of the Serbia Centre, an organisation led by Zdravko Ponoš.

Early life and career
Vukomanović was born in Virovitica, then part of the Socialist Republic of Croatia in the Socialist Federal Republic of Yugoslavia. She holds a bachelor's degree from the University of Belgrade Faculty of Political Sciences (1989), a master's degree from the Central European University in Hungary (1995), and a Ph.D. from the University of Belgrade Faculty of Political Sciences (2009). She worked at the University of Belgrade Institute of Social Sciences as a researcher from 1992 to 2000. Since 2000, she has been a research associate at the Institute of Political Studies in Belgrade. She has published widely on topics such as nationalism and political transitions in post-communist countries. She has also been active in non-governmental organizations devoted to human rights, democracy, and local self-government.

Political career
Vukomanović joined the Socialist Party in October 1996, although she was not publicly associated with the party for several years thereafter. In 2010, she explained her initial decision to join the party as follows: "At that time [in 1996] the Socialists claimed to have 600,000 members. I doubted the authenticity of those claims and asked Milan Jovanović, a Socialist, whether that number could be verified. He told me the best way to check was to become an SPS member. I took his advice and signed up and I received a membership card with a serial number based on the number 600,000." Notwithstanding her membership in the party, she was an opponent of its leader Slobodan Milošević during this period. In July 2001, she argued that the Socialist Party would benefit from Milošević's extradition to the International Criminal Tribunal for the former Yugoslavia in The Hague, in that it would permit the party's transformation into a modern, European-style organization. Milošević died in 2006, and the party subsequently distanced itself from his legacy.

At the Socialist Party's eighth congress in December 2010, Vukomanović co-authored a new platform that positioned the party as a more liberal party of the left, focused on European integration. She became a party vice-president at the same congress. In accepting the position, she said, "My political orientation has always been leftist, which is why it was natural for me to be with the Socialists, because they are the most authentic party in Serbia." Referring to the party's position within Serbia's political climate, she stated, "We are neither communist nor nationalists; we are socialists."

Member of the National Assembly

Socialist Party
Vukomanović received the fifth position on the Socialist Party's electoral list in the 2012 Serbian parliamentary election and was elected when the list won forty-four mandates. During the campaign, she said that the party's top priorities would be "preserving existing jobs and enabling employment for young and qualified people." In the immediate aftermath of the election, she speculated on the continuation of Serbia's existing coalition government of the Democratic Party (Demokratska stranka, DS) and the Socialists. Ultimately, however, the Socialists formed a new government with the Serbian Progressive Party. Vukomanović served as a supporter of the administration in the assembly and was selected as a member of Serbia's delegation to the Parliamentary Assembly of the Organization for Security and Co-operation in Europe (OSCE PA). She was also a prominent SPS media spokesperson in this period.

In October 2012, Serbian president Tomislav Nikolić said that Serbia would abandon its plans to join the European Union (EU) if it was required to recognize the independence of Kosovo as a condition of membership. Responding to this statement, Vukomanović said, "We must be prepared both for the best-case scenario, which is to have both Kosovo and EU integration, and for the worst-case scenario, which is to lose both." She added that, in the event of an ultimatum on Kosovo, Nikolić's response would be a legitimate option and that the matter should be decided by a referendum.

She again received the fifth position on the Socialist Party's list in the 2014 Serbian parliamentary election and was re-elected when it again won forty-four mandates. The Progressive Party won the elections and formed a modified coalition government with the Socialists and other parties. Vukomanović served on the assembly's foreign affairs committee and became the leader of Serbia's delegation to the OSCE PA in this sitting of parliament. At a 2014 OSCE meeting in Croatia, she spoke of the shared historical, cultural, and economic ties binding all countries in south-eastern Europe and urged other countries to follow the example of Slovenia and Croatia in joining the European Union.

After Syriza won a historic victory in the January 2015 Greek legislative election, Vukomanović dismissed suggestions that the Socialist Party would shift its economic program to the left as a result. She noted that the Socialist Party was aligned with the rival Panhellenic Socialist Movement (PASOK) and described Syriza as an "ultra-leftist" group.

Her term as vice-president came to an end in September 2015, and she became chair of the Socialist Party's executive committee.

Vukomanović received the sixth position on the Socialist Party's electoral list for the 2016 parliamentary election and was returned for a third term when the list won twenty-nine mandates. The Progressives again won the election and continued in a governing alliance with the Socialists afterwards. There were rumours in this period that Vukomanović would be appointed to a cabinet position, though ultimately this did not occur.

Vukomanović left the Socialist Party in October 2016. She did not provide a reason for her departure, though media reports noted that she had previously been reprimanded for a public quarrel with party official Ivana Petrović. After leaving the party, she lost her committee roles and her position as head of Serbia's delegation to the OSCE PA. She later accused the Socialist Party of having lost its identity and become a vassal of Progressive Party leader Aleksandar Vučić.

People's Party
Vukomanović joined a new oppositional parliamentary group called New Serbia–Movement for Serbia's Salvation in February 2017, with members of New Serbia and former members of the Democratic Party of Serbia (Demokratska stranka Srbije, DSS). She was a prominent supporter of Vuk Jeremić's candidacy in the 2017 Serbian presidential election and joined Jeremić's People's Party shortly after its founding convention in October 2017. She is currently a member of the party's presidency and the president of its women's forum.

Despite having lost her committee roles and her membership in the OSCE PA, Vukomanović remains a member of the parliamentary friendship groups with Germany, Montenegro, and the United Kingdom.

Municipal politics
The People's Party contested the 2018 Belgrade City Assembly election on a coalition electoral list led by former mayor Dragan Đilas. Vukomanović received the thirteenth position on the list and was elected when the alliance won twenty-six seats. The election was won by the Progressive Party and its allies. Vukomanović was subsequently chosen as deputy leader of the People's Party group in the municipal assembly.

References

1967 births
Living people
People from Virovitica
Politicians from Belgrade
21st-century Serbian women politicians
21st-century Serbian politicians
Serbs of Croatia
Members of the National Assembly (Serbia)
Members of the City Assembly of Belgrade
Members of the Parliamentary Assembly of the Organization for Security and Co-operation in Europe
Socialist Party of Serbia politicians
People's Party (Serbia, 2017) politicians
Women members of the National Assembly (Serbia)